Bognár or Bognar is a Hungarian surname meaning "wheelwright". Notable people with the surname include:

György Bognár (born 1961), retired Hungarian football player
László Bognár, (born 1968), former Hungarian professional boxer
Rick Bognar (1970–2019), Canadian professional wrestler
Steven Bognar (born 1963), American Oscar-winning documentary filmmaker
Zoran Bognar (born 1965), Serbian poet and writer
Zsolt Bognár (born 1979), Hungarian football player

Hungarian-language surnames
Occupational surnames